Gerard Gibbons (born January 7, 1953) is a former Canadian professional ice hockey player who played in the World Hockey Association (WHA). Drafted in the fifth round of the 1973 NHL Amateur Draft by the Montreal Canadiens, Gibbons opted to play in the WHA after being selected by the Toronto Toros in the seventh round of the 1973 WHA Amateur Draft. He played parts of two WHA seasons for the Toros. His older brother, Brian Gibbons, also played in the WHA.

References

External links

1953 births
Living people
Canadian ice hockey defencemen
Charlotte Checkers (SHL) players
Ice hockey people from Newfoundland and Labrador
Jacksonville Barons players
Mohawk Valley Comets (NAHL) players
Montreal Canadiens draft picks
Sportspeople from St. John's, Newfoundland and Labrador
Toronto Toros draft picks
Toronto Toros players